Galdhøi is a mountain in Lom Municipality in Innlandet county, Norway. The mountain is surrounded by several other notable mountains including Juvvasshøi and Store Lauvhøi to the northeast, Glittertinden to the east, Galdhøpiggen to the southwest, and Storhøi to the northwest.

See also
List of mountains of Norway by height

References

Jotunheimen
Lom, Norway
Mountains of Innlandet